Artem Kozlov may refer to:
Artem Kozlov (footballer, born 1992), Ukrainian football midfielder
Artem Kozlov (footballer, born 1997), Ukrainian football defender